Phyllonorycter fabaceaella is a moth of the family Gracillariidae. It is known from Tajikistan.

The larvae feed on Lathyrus species. They probably mine the leaves of their host plant.

References

fabaceaella
Moths of Asia
Moths described in 1978